Stansiya Daşarx (also, Daşarx) is a village and municipality in the Sharur District of Nakhchivan, Azerbaijan.  It has a population of 407.

References

See also
Aşağı Daşarx
Yuxarı Daşarx

Populated places in Sharur District